John S. Battle High School is a high school located in the Southwest portion of Virginia in Washington County. Built in 1959, the school was named after former Virginia Governor John S. Battle.

Extracurricular activities

Baseball
John Battle won the state championships for baseball in 2000 and 2001.

Volleyball
John Battle won the state championships for volleyball in 1989 and 1991.

Tennis
The John Battle Girls' Tennis team won the 2008 state championship.

Softball 
Both John S Battle's Junior Varsity and Varsity had an undefeated 2021  regular season.

Notable alumni
Jimmy Gobble, Kansas City Royals Pitcher
Mike Helton, NASCAR

References

External links
John S. Battle High School Website

Educational institutions established in 1959
Public high schools in Virginia
Schools in Washington County, Virginia
1959 establishments in Virginia